When Love Comes Calling may refer to:

 When Love Comes Calling (Deniece Williams album), a 1979 album
 When Love Comes Calling (George Benson album), a 1996 EP

See also
 "When Love Comes Callin'", a 1990 song by Sawyer Brown